John Edwards Russell (January 20, 1834 – October 28, 1903) was a U.S. Representative from Massachusetts.

Born in Greenfield, Massachusetts, Russell was instructed by private tutors.
He returned to Massachusetts and became interested in mail transportation west of the Mississippi River and in steamship lines on the Pacific coast.
He engaged in agricultural pursuits.

Russell was elected secretary of the Massachusetts State Board of Agriculture in 1880.
He was reelected five times.

Russell was elected as a Democrat to the Fiftieth (March 4, 1887 – March 3, 1889).
He served as delegate to the Democratic National Convention in 1892.
He was an unsuccessful candidate for Governor of Massachusetts in 1893 and 1894.
He served as member of the Deep Waterways Commission.
He died in Leicester, Massachusetts, October 28, 1903.
He was interred in Pine Grove Cemetery.

References

External links
 
 

1834 births
1903 deaths
People from Greenfield, Massachusetts
Democratic Party members of the United States House of Representatives from Massachusetts
19th-century American politicians